The 1994 Metro Atlantic Athletic Conference baseball tournament took place from May 13 through 15, 1994. This was the first tournament held to determine the champion of the Metro Atlantic Athletic Conference for the 1994 NCAA Division I baseball season. The top two regular season finishers of the league's two divisions met in the double-elimination tournament held at Heritage Park in Colonie, New York.  won the championship and advanced to a play-in round for the right to compete in the 1994 NCAA Division I baseball tournament.

Seeding 
The top two teams from each division were seeded based on their conference winning percentage. They then played a double-elimination tournament.

Results

All-Tournament Team 
The following players were named to the All-Tournament Team.

Most Valuable Player 
Victor Santos was named Tournament Most Valuable Player. Santos was a junior pitcher for Saint Peter's.

References 

Tournament
Metro Atlantic Athletic Conference Baseball Tournament
Metro Atlantic Athletic Conference baseball tournament